The 2014–15 FC Karpaty Lviv season was the 52nd season in club history.

Review and events
On 15 June 2014 FC Karpaty gathered at club's base for medical inspection after vacations and were introduced a new manager, Igor Jovićević, few days later. On 1 July 2014 Karpaty went for two and half week long pre-season training camp in Slovenia with seven friendly matches scheduled.

On contrary to the previous season club decided to use their own young players rather than experienced loanees, thus losing all attacking potential before the start of season, including such crucial players as Oleksandr Hladkyi, Sergei Zenjov and Mladen Bartulović who together scored 26 out of the 32 Karpaty goals in 2013–14 Ukrainian Premier League.

Competitions

Friendly matches

Pre-season

Winter break

Mid-season

Premier League

League table

Results summary

Matches

Ukrainian Cup

Squad information

Squad and statistics

Squad, appearances and goals

|-
|colspan="14"|Players away from the club on loan:

|-
|colspan="14"|Players featured for Karpaty but left before the end of the season:

|}

Goalscorers

Disciplinary record

Transfers

In

Out

Managerial changes

Sources

Karpaty Lviv
FC Karpaty Lviv seasons